Barrett Long is a Grand Prix motorcycle racer from United States. He races in the MotoAmerica Superstock 1000 Championship aboard a Ducati Panigale.

Career statistics

By season

Races by year
(key)

References

External links
 Profile on motogp.com

1984 births
Living people
American motorcycle racers
250cc World Championship riders
AMA Superbike Championship riders